The Jago Nunataks are a cluster of closely spaced nunataks rising to , centred  east of the south end of Neall Massif in the Concord Mountains of Antarctica. They were named by the New Zealand Antarctic Place-Names Committee in 1983 after J.B. Jago, a geologist with the New Zealand Antarctic Research Programme geological parties to this area in 1974–75 and 1980–81. These topographical Nunataks lie situated on the Pennell Coast, a portion of Antarctica lying between Cape Williams and Cape Adare.

References

Nunataks of Victoria Land
Pennell Coast